The 2020 Road to the Kentucky Derby was a series of races through which horses qualified for the 2020 Kentucky Derby, which was held on September 5 (rescheduled from the traditional first Saturday in May due to the coronavirus pandemic). The field for the Derby is limited to 20 horses, with up to four 'also eligibles' in case of a late withdrawal from the field. There are three separate paths for horses to take to qualify for the Derby: the main Road consisting of races in North America (plus one in Dubai), the Japan Road consisting of four races in Japan, and the European Road with seven European races in England, Ireland and France. The top four finishers in the specified races receive points, with higher points awarded in the major prep races. Earnings in non-restricted stakes races act as a tie breaker.

When originally announced in September 2019, the main Road to the Kentucky Derby would have remained substantially the same as the 2019 Road to the Kentucky Derby, consisting of 35 races, 19 races for the Kentucky Derby Prep Season and 16 races for the Kentucky Derby Championship Season. However in March 2020, the growing coronavirus pandemic prompted the cancellation of several prep races, and the rescheduling of the Derby itself. Churchill Downs added more qualifying races to the series in May  which became known as the Extended Series.

Main Road to the Kentucky Derby

Standings

The following table shows the points earned in the eligible races for the main series. The ranking is for horses that are still pointing towards the race, as shown on the Derby Leaderboard published by Churchill Downs on August 22, updated for subsequently announced withdrawals from the field.

Authentic, who was the eventual winner of the Kentucky Derby, qualified for the race in second place by winning the Haskell, Sham and San Felipe, plus finishing second in the Santa Anita Derby.

 Winner of Kentucky Derby in bold
 Sidelined/Inactive/No longer under Derby Consideration/Not nominated in gray

Prep season

Note: 1st=10 points; 2nd=4 points; 3rd=2 points; 4th=1 point (except the Breeders' Cup Juvenile: 1st=20 points; 2nd=8 points; 3rd=4 points; 4th=2 points)

Championship series events

First leg of series
Note: 1st=50 points; 2nd=20 points; 3rd=10 points; 4th=5 points

Second leg of series
These races are the major preps for the Kentucky Derby, and are thus weighted more heavily.  Additional races are scheduled to be added in the summer as to make up for cancelled races towards the September 5 Derby. Note: 1st=100 points; 2nd=40 points; 3rd=20 points; 4th=10 points

'Wild Card' events
Note: 1st=20 points; 2nd=8 points; 3rd=4 points; 4th=2 points

Extended series events
The following races were announced for the extension of the Road to the Kentucky Derby as a result of the Derby being run in September instead of May.

Note: 
Belmont Stakes:  1st=150 points;  2nd=60 points; 3rd=30 points; 4th=15 points
Blue Grass Stakes, Santa Anita Derby, Haskell Invitational, Travers Stakes: 1st=100 points; 2nd=40 points; 3rd=20 points; 4th=10 points
Matt Winn Stakes, Ellis Park Derby, Shared Belief Stakes, Peter Pan Stakes:  1st=50 points; 2nd=20 points; 3rd=10 points; 4th=5 points 
Pegasus Stakes, Indiana Derby, Los Alamitos Derby, Ohio Derby:  1st=20 points; 2nd=8 points; 3rd=4 points; 4th=2 points

Japan Road to the Kentucky Derby

The Japan Road to the Kentucky Derby is intended to provide a place in the Derby starting gate to the top finisher in the series. If the connections of that horse decline the invitation, their place is offered to the second-place finisher and so on through the top four finishers. If neither of the top four accept, this place in the starting gate reverts to the horses on the main road to the Derby.

The top point earners were Café Pharoah(70 points), Danon Pharoah (40 points), Herrschaft (40 points) and Dieu du Vin (26 points). None of the invitations were accepted.

Races

Note: 
Cattleya Sho:  1st=10 points; 2nd=4 points; 3rd=2 points; 4th=1 point
Zen-Nippon Nisai Yushun:  1st=20 points; 2nd=8 points; 3rd=4 points; 4th=2 points
Hyacinth: 1st=30 points; 2nd=12 points; 3rd=6 points; 4th=3 points
Other 3 races : 1st=40 points; 2nd=16 points; 3rd=8 points; 4th=4 points

Qualification Table
The top four horses (colored brown within the standings) are eligible to participate in the Kentucky Derby provided the horse is nominated.

Notes: 
 brown highlight – qualified on points but declined offer
 grey highlight – did not qualify

European Road to the Kentucky Derby

The European Road to the Kentucky Derby is designed on a similar basis to the Japan Road and is intended to provide a place in the Derby starting gate to the top finisher in the series. If the connections of that horse decline the invitation, their place is offered to the second-place finisher and so on. If none of the top four accept, this place in the starting gate reverts to the horses on the main road to the Derby.

The series was supposed to consist of seven races – four run on the turf in late 2019 when the horses were age two, plus three races run on a synthetic surface in early 2020. The last race in the series, the Cardinal Stakes, was postponed when horse racing in Britain was suspended from mid-March due to the coronavirus pandemic. 

The top point earners were Nobel Prize (30 points), Crossfirehurricane (20 points), Chares (20 points) and Kameko (14 points). None of the invitations were accepted.

Races

Note:
 the four races in 2019 for two-year-olds: 1st=10 points; 2nd=4 points; 3rd=2 points; 4th=1 point
 the first two races in 2020: 1st=20 points; 2nd=8 points; 3rd=4 points; 4th=2 points
 The Cardinal Stakes: 1st=30 points; 2nd=12 points; 3rd=6 points; 4th=3 points

Qualification Table
The top four horses (colored brown within the standings) are eligible to participate in the Kentucky Derby provided the horse is nominated.

Notes: 
 brown highlight – qualified on points but declined offer
 grey highlight – did not qualify

See also
2020 Road to the Kentucky Oaks

Notes

References

External links

Road to the Kentucky Derby, 2020
Road to the Kentucky Derby
Road to the Kentucky Derby
Road to the Kentucky Derby